Prince Frederick Emil August of Schleswig-Holstein-Sonderburg-Augustenburg (Kiel, 23 August 1800 – Bayreuth, Germany, 2 July 1865), usually simply known by just his first name, Frederick, Prince of Noer, was a prince of the House of Schleswig-Holstein-Sonderburg-Augustenburg and a cadet-line descendant of the Danish royal house.

He was the second and youngest son of Louise Auguste of Denmark and Frederik Christian II, Duke of Schleswig-Holstein-Sonderburg-Augustenburg. As such, he was close to succeed in the Danish throne. He was the brother-in-law of King Christian VIII and nephew of King Frederik VI. His elder brother, Christian August II, succeeded in 1814 as the Duke of Schleswig-Holstein-Sonderburg-Augustenburg.

After his second, morganatic union, he renounced the rights of succession to House of Augustenburg. He was created Prince of Noer or Nør by Emperor Franz Joseph of Austria afterwards.

Prince Frederick died 1865 at Bayreuth.

Life 
Frederick was the second son of Frederick Christian II, Duke of Schleswig-Holstein-Sonderburg-Augustenburg, and Louise Augusta of Denmark. In 1832, Louise Augusta purchased both the Grönwohld estate and the neighboring Noer estate for her son. At this point, he assumed the title "Prince of Noer." After the death of Prince Frederik of Hesse in 1845, son and successor of his father Prince Charles of Hesse-Kassel as governor of Schleswig-Holstein, Prince Frederick took this office. 

Due to the complicated nature of succession, Frederick and his older brother, Christian August II, Duke of Schleswig-Holstein-Sonderburg-Ausgustenburg, both saw themselves as rightful heirs to the duchies, as well as the Kingdom of Denmark. The two shared a goal of achieving a united Schleswig-Holstein belonging to the German Confederation, complete with a liberal constitution.

In March 1848, Prince Frederick became the Minister of War in Schleswig-Holstein's provisional government, and commanded the duchies' army during the First Schleswig War until 7 April 1850. Upon Schleswig-Holstein's capitulation to Denmark, Frederick went into exile (1851) and for a time in 1852 was documented as residing in Devon, England. In Denmark, chamber pots were sold featuring a picture of Frederick at the bottom.

In 1864, after the Kingdom of Prussia and the German Confederation had, under the Austrian Empire's leadership, defeated Denmark in the Second Schleswig War, Frederick was reassigned the title of "Prince of Noer" by decree of Emperor Franz Joseph I of Austria.

Prince Frederick and his first wife are buried in Krusendorf.

Marriage and issue
Frederick married on 17 September 1829, at Augustenburg, his second cousin Countess Henriette Danneskjold-Samsøe (9 May 1806 - 10 September 1858) who was a Danish noblewoman and great-great-great granddaughter of Christian V of Denmark, belonging to an illegitimate branch of the House of Oldenburg. His brother had married his wife's elder sister nine year previous.  They had four children:

Prince  of Schleswig-Holstein-Sonderburg-Augustenburg (23 August 1830 - 25 December 1881), married in 1870 Carmelita Eisenblat (21 August 1848 - 11 August 1912) and took the title Count of Noer
Prince Christian of Schleswig-Holstein-Sonderburg-Augustenburg (13 December 1832 - 3 February 1834), died young
Princess Louise Caroline Henriette Auguste of Schleswig-Holstein-Sonderburg-Augustenburg (29 July 1836 - 25 September 1866), married in 1865 Prince Michael Vlangali-Handjeri (c. 1833 - 11 August 1911), a maternal grandson of Alexander Handjeri
Princess Marie of Schleswig-Holstein-Sonderburg-Augustenburg (8 August 1838 - 3 February 1839), died young

After Henriette's death, Frederick married morganatically on 3 November 1864, at Paris, Mary Esther Lee (3 October 1837 - 4 July 1914), the third daughter of David Lee, a New York merchant.  They were childless. Eight years after the death of her first husband, the Princess married Count Alfred von Waldersee, a General who was later created Field Marshal.

Ancestry

References

External links 

 Herzöge von Augustenburg

Princes of Schleswig-Holstein-Sonderburg-Augustenburg
House of Augustenburg
1798 births
1865 deaths
People from Augustenborg, Denmark
People of the First Schleswig War